The Jūrmala Grand Prix was a one-day cycling race held in Jūrmala, Latvia. It was part of the UCI Europe Tour in category 1.1.

Winners

References

External links
 

Cycle races in Latvia
Recurring sporting events established in 2011
UCI Europe Tour races
Defunct cycling races in Latvia